The Guess Who are a Canadian rock band formed in Winnipeg, Manitoba, in 1965. The band originated in 1962 and achieved an international hit single with a cover of "Shakin' All Over" in 1965 under the name Chad Allan and the Expressions. After changing their name to The Guess Who, they found their greatest success in the late 60s and early 70s, under the leadership of singer/keyboardist Burton Cummings and guitarist Randy Bachman, with hit songs including "American Woman", "These Eyes", and "No Time".

During their most successful period, The Guess Who released eleven studio albums, all of which reached the charts in Canada and the United States. They may be best known for their 1970 album American Woman, which reached no. 1 in Canada and no. 9 in the United States, while five other albums reached the top ten in Canada. The Guess Who charted fourteen Top 40 singles in the United States and more than thirty in Canada. 

The Guess Who officially broke up in 1975, though bassist Jim Kale and/or drummer Garry Peterson have toured and recorded under The Guess Who name since 1977, frequently with no other original band members involved.

History

Origins (1958–1965)
The origins of The Guess Who date back to 1958, when Winnipeg singer/guitarist Chad Allan formed a local rock band called Allan and the Silvertones. After several lineup changes, the band stabilized in 1962 under the name Chad Allan and the Reflections, which included Allan and keyboardist Bob Ashley, plus future Guess Who mainstays Randy Bachman on guitar, Jim Kale on bass, and Garry Peterson on drums.

The band released their first single, "Tribute To Buddy Holly", on Canadian-American Records in 1962. They then signed with Quality Records and released several singles in 1963–64, which gained some regional notice around Winnipeg but made little impact in the rest of Canada. One single was mis-credited to Bob Ashley and the Reflections. 

In 1965, the group changed their name to Chad Allan and the Expressions after an American group called  The Reflections released the hit single "(Just Like) Romeo and Juliet". They released the garage rock album Shakin' All Over in January 1965. That album's single, a cover of "Shakin' All Over" by Johnny Kidd & the Pirates, was the band's first major hit, reaching no. 1 in Canada, no. 22 in the United States, and no. 27 in Australia. Their American label, Quality Records, disguised the single by crediting it to Guess Who?, as a publicity stunt to generate speculation that it was by a more famous British Invasion band working incognito.

After Quality Records revealed the band to be Chad Allan and the Expressions, disc jockeys continued to announce the group as Guess Who?, effectively forcing the band to accept the new name. They released their second album, Hey Ho (What You Do to Me!) in late 1965; it was credited to Chad Allan and the Expressions with "Guess Who?" displayed prominently on the cover.

Transitional years (1966–1968)
Keyboardist Bob Ashley left the band in late 1965 due to the rigors of touring. He was replaced by 18-year-old Burton Cummings (formerly of Winnipeg group the Deverons) who also took on lead vocal duties in conjunction with Chad Allan. Just a few months later, Allan departed; he returned to college and then became a media personality with the CBC. This left Cummings as the sole lead singer. With Allan departed, the "Chad Allan and the Expressions" subtitle was dropped from the band's releases, and they were billed solely as The Guess Who?. (The question mark would be dropped in 1968.) After Allan's departure in 1966, guitarist Bruce Decker, a former bandmate of Cummings in the Deverons, joined for a few months. The band then settled as a quartet with Cummings on vocals and keyboards, Bachman on guitar, Kale on bass, and Peterson on drums. This lineup released the album It's Time in the summer of 1966. Decker, despite being pictured on the cover of the album, did not participate in the recording.  Conversely, some contributions by Allan (recorded before he left the group) can be heard on the album, though he is not credited.

The band continued to release singles that were moderately successful in Canada, and "His Girl" entered the UK charts in 1967. The band travelled to the United Kingdom to promote the single, but this was a financial mistake as the song quickly dropped off the charts. They were unable to book shows or obtain work visas while in the UK, and returned to Canada heavily in debt. Later in 1967, The Guess Who were hired as the house band for the CBC Radio show The Swingers, and as the house band for the CBC television program Let's Go, which was hosted by their former bandmate Chad Allan. They initially performed hit singles by other artists, but the CBC producers encouraged them to develop more of their own music as well. This gave The Guess Who greater exposure in Canada and financial stability for the next two years.

After seeing The Guess Who on Let's Go, record producer/sales executive Jack Richardson contacted the band about participating in an advertising project for Coca-Cola. This project became a split album titled A Wild Pair with Ottawa band the Staccatos (soon to rename themselves Five Man Electrical Band). The album could only be purchased by mail order from Coca-Cola. Richardson served as The Guess Who's producer until their classic-era dissolution in 1975, and they were managed during that entire period by Don Hunter.

Beginning of the classic era (1968–1970)

Richardson signed the Guess Who to his Nimbus 9 label and production company, and personally financed the recording of a new album in late 1968. They were also signed to RCA for distribution outside of Canada. The band transitioned from their original garage rock roots to a more mature pop-rock sound with soul and jazz influences. Wheatfield Soul was released in early 1969 and achieved success in both Canada and the United States. The single "These Eyes" reached the top ten in the United States and became a gold record with sales of more than one million copies. The follow-up album Canned Wheat was released in September 1969, and featured the double-sided hit single "Laughing"/"Undun".

For their next album, the band adopted more hard rock influences. American Woman was released in January 1970 and became a substantial worldwide hit. It was their first album to top the Canadian albums chart, and their first to reach the top ten on the American albums chart. The title track reached no. 1 in both countries and was also a substantial hit in the United Kingdom. This made The Guess Who the first Canadian band to achieve a chart-topping single in the United States during the Billboard Hot 100 era. (Canadian doo-wop group The Crew Cuts had a number one single in 1954, before that chart was instituted.) "No Time" and "No Sugar Tonight/New Mother Nature" also reached high on the singles charts in both Canada and the United States.

Personnel changes and continued success (1970–1975)
While American Woman became a success in the early months of 1970, Bachman recorded an all-instrumental solo album titled Axe with Peterson on drums. The Guess Who began recording a follow up to American Woman, completing seven tracks. (The tracks were withheld and not released until 1976 under the title The Way They Were.) Bachman then took a break from touring with The Guess Who due to illness, with American guitarist Bobby Sabellico filling in temporarily. Bachman played a final show with the band and then quit in May 1970; his relations with Cummings had deteriorated and his recent conversion to Mormonism caused dissatisfaction with the band's rock n' roll lifestyle. Bachman later formed the successful hard rock band Bachman-Turner Overdrive.

Indicating a move into more intricate arrangements and vocal harmonies, while shooting for album rock radio, the Guess Who replaced Bachman with two guitarists from the Winnipeg rock scene: Kurt Winter from the band Brother, and Greg Leskiw from the band Wild Rice. Winter brought some songs from his previous band and became one of the Guess Who's primary songwriters. Leskiw occasionally contributed lead vocals. On July 17, 1970, the band was invited to perform at the White House for US President Richard Nixon's family and guests, but they were asked not to play "American Woman" due to its apparent criticism of the United States.

The expanded lineup quickly recorded the album Share the Land, which was released in late 1970 and became another substantial hit in both Canada and the United States. Songs from the albums Wheatfield Soul through Share the Land were compiled for the album The Best of The Guess Who, which became another successful release in both countries in 1971. 

The band's commercial fortunes and chart performance then declined in the United States, perhaps due to an inability to be taken seriously by the fans of album rock radio, though they remained very successful in their native Canada. They released the albums So Long, Bannatyne in mid-1971, and Rockin' in early 1972. Both albums displayed more progressive and experimental elements. Shortly after the release of Rockin, Leskiw suddenly left the band in the middle of a US tour after a disagreement with Cummings. Leskiw was replaced on short notice by guitarist/singer Donnie McDougall, a veteran of the Winnipeg rock scene who had most recently played with the Vancouver-based Mother Tucker's Yellow Duck. With McDougall on board, the band recorded the album Live at the Paramount at the Paramount Theatre in Seattle in May 1972; it was released in August and included some songs that had not appeared on previous studio albums.

Just two months after McDougall joined, founding bassist Jim Kale left the band; he then joined Scrubbaloe Caine who achieved some Canadian hit singles in the mid-1970s. The Guess Who replaced Kale with Bill Wallace, who had played with Kurt Winter in their early Winnipeg band Brother. This lineup released the albums Artificial Paradise in early 1973, #10 in late 1973 (the title of which represented their number of original albums with RCA up to that point), and Road Food in early 1974. Road Food included the single "Clap for the Wolfman", which was a substantial hit in both Canada and the United States, and the band's first top ten American single since 1970. The novelty song was a tribute to disc jockey Wolfman Jack, who lent his voice to the recording.

For undisclosed reasons, guitarists Winter and McDougall were dismissed from the band in June 1974. They were replaced by a single guitarist, Domenic Troiano, who had founded the successful Canadian band Bush and had also served briefly with James Gang. Having grown up in Toronto, Troiano was the first member of The Guess Who not to hail from Winnipeg. He had also collaborated with an earlier version of The Guess Who on an aborted movie soundtrack in 1970 and had played on Randy Bachman's album Axe that year. The lineup of Cummings, Troiano, Wallace, and Peterson released the albums Flavours in late 1974 and Power in the Music in mid-1975. Due to Troiano's songwriting influence, these albums moved toward jazz rock; Cummings was unhappy with the stylistic change and disbanded The Guess Who in October 1975.

Dispute over "The Guess Who" name

"The Guess Who" name is currently owned by former bassist Jim Kale, who is now retired but has allowed the name to be used by the current lineup of musicians. In 1977, Kale asked Burton Cummings for permission to use the Guess Who name for a single reunion concert, and discovered that the name had never been trademarked in Canada. Kale then acquired the trademark himself, five years after he left the band and unbeknownst to the other members. Kale used his ownership of the name to tour on the nostalgia circuit in the United States semi-regularly until the 2010s, with a wide variety of musicians called "The Guess Who". Under Kale's leadership, several non-charting albums were released under The Guess Who name, supported by a revolving lineup of musicians with no historic connection to the band. During this period, Kale temporarily retired multiple times, leaving no original members in the lineups performing on the nostalgia circuit. Drummer Garry Peterson sproadically appeared in such lineups as well. After Kale's retirement in 2016, Peterson is the last remaining original member and continues to lead a band using The Guess Who name.

Both Cummings and Randy Bachman have been highly critical of the Kale/Peterson version of the band, comparing it to a cover band and calling it "the fake Guess Who." The dispute is often compared to John Fogerty's dispute with his former bandmates over the use of the name Creedence Clearwater Revisited, although it has not become litigious like that dispute. Unable to use The Guess Who name, Bachman and Cummings have toured and recorded together under the name "Bachman-Cummings".

Classic lineup reunions
Members of the classic-era Guess Who reunited a number of times over the years, the first being when Burton Cummings, Randy Bachman, Garry Peterson, and late-classic era bassist Bill Wallace reformed for a CBC television special in November 1979. This was followed by a short tour of notable Canadian cultural venues in 1983, resulting in the live album Together Again! (known as The Best of The Guess Who - Live! in the United States). In May 1997, with their hometown of Winnipeg facing severe floods, Cummings and Bachman reunited for a fundraiser for disaster relief, organized by Canadian actor Tom Jackson. At the request of the Premier of Manitoba, Cummings, Bachman, Kale, and Peterson appeared together at the closing ceremonies of the Pan American Games at Winnipeg Stadium on August 8, 1999. This inspired plans for a reunion tour, though Kale dropped out for health-related reasons. Another lineup featuring classic-era members Cummings, Bachman, Peterson, Donnie McDougall, and Bill Wallace engaged in a lengthy reunion tour from 2000 to 2003, including playing the halftime show at the 2000 Grey Cup. On July 30, 2003, this lineup performed before an estimated audience of 450,000 at the Molson Canadian Rocks for Toronto SARS benefit concert. The show was the largest outdoor ticketed event in Canadian history. Since 2003, Bachman and Cummings have collaborated occasionally, but have not been able to use The Guess Who name due to refusals from Kale, who continues to own the trademark.

Legacy

The Guess Who were inducted into the Canadian Music Hall of Fame in 1987. In 2001, classic era members of The Guess Who received honorary doctorates from Brandon University in Brandon, Manitoba. For Cummings, this was a special honour because he had not graduated from high school. That same year, the group was inducted into Canada's Walk of Fame. The signatures of then-current band members Bachman, Cummings, McDougall, Peterson, and Wallace are engraved into the commemorative stone. In 2002, the same group of former members received the Governor General's Performing Arts Award for Lifetime Artistic Achievement for their contributions to popular music in Canada. In 2018, a number of master tapes of the band's recordings, possibly including unreleased material, were donated to the St. Vital Museum in Winnipeg.

MembersCurrent membersGarry Peterson – drums, percussion, backing vocals 
Leonard Shaw – keyboards, saxophones, flute, backing vocals 
Derek Sharp – lead vocals, rhythm guitar, piano 
Michael Staertow – lead guitar, backing vocals 
Michael Devin – bass guitar, backing vocals 

DiscographyAs Chad Allan and the Expressions (Guess Who?) Shakin' All Over (1965)
 Hey Ho (What You Do to Me!) (1965)As The Guess Who? 
 It's Time (1966)
 A Wild Pair (with The Staccatos) (1968)As The Guess Who Wheatfield Soul (1969)
 Canned Wheat (1969)
 American Woman (1970)
 Share the Land (1970)
 So Long, Bannatyne (1971)
 Rockin' (1972)
 Live at the Paramount (1972)
 Artificial Paradise (1973)
 #10 (1973)
 Road Food (1974)
 Flavours (1974)
 Power in the Music (1975)
 Together Again (1984)Post Burton Cummings–era albums credited to 'The Guess Who''''
 Guess Who's Back (1978)
 All This for a Song (1979)
 Now and Not Then (1981)
 Liberty (1994; repackaged as Lonely One, 1995)
 The Future IS What It Used To Be (2018)
 Plein D'Amour (2023)

Filmography
 1983: Together Again (live concert with interviews)
 2002: Running Back Thru Canada (live with bonus tracks)
 2003: Molson Canadian Rocks for Toronto (two tracks only) .
 2007: Shakin' in Las Vegas (DVD with concert performance and four new songs ) 

See also

 Canadian rock
 List of bands from Canada

References

Further reading
 1995: American Woman: The Story of The Guess Who by John Einarson; Quarry Press, Ontario, Canada
 2020: Wheatfield Empire: The Listeners Guide to The Guess Who'' by Robert Lawson; Friesen Press, Ontario Canada

External links
 
 
 
 Article at canadianbands.com

 
1965 establishments in Manitoba
1975 disestablishments in Canada
1977 establishments in Manitoba
Canadian blues rock musical groups
Canadian hard rock musical groups
Canadian Music Hall of Fame inductees
Canadian psychedelic rock music groups
Governor General's Performing Arts Award winners
Hilltak Records artists
Juno Award winners
Musical groups established in 1965
Musical groups disestablished in 1975
Musical groups reestablished in 1977
Musical groups from Winnipeg
Quality Records artists